Jean (John) B. LeBlanc (born November 23, 1939 in Rogersville, New Brunswick) is a Canadian retired jockey in Thoroughbred horse racing. He competed at many of the top racetracks in the United States but for most of his career was based in Ontario where he was commonly known as John, the English language translation for his name.

LeBlanc is best known for riding Jean-Louis Lévesque's La Prevoyante through an undefeated 1972 campaign in North America. An inductee in both the Canadian Horse Racing Hall of Fame and U.S. Racing Hall of Fame, the filly won all twelve of her starts under LeBlanc en route to be voted the 1972 Eclipse Award as American Champion Two-Year-Old Filly, the National Turf Writers Association's  U.S. Horse of the Year and the Sovereign Award as the Canadian Horse of the Year.

Canadian and U.S. Triple Crown 

A winner of 1,466 races during his career, John LeBlanc was the jockey chosen by trainer Lucien Laurin to ride Angle Light, Secretariat's entrymate in the 1973 Kentucky Derby. Among his other career highlights, LeBlanc won four Canadian Triple Crown races,  taking back-to-back runnings of the Breeders' Stakes in 1968 and 1969 and the Prince of Wales Stakes  in 1972 and 1984.

In 2006, LeBlanc received the Avelino Gomez Memorial Award, an honor given to a jockey in Canada who has made a significant contribution to the sport of Thoroughbred horse racing.

References

1939 births
Living people
Avelino Gomez Memorial Award winners
Canadian jockeys
People from Northumberland County, New Brunswick